Mirnov may refer to:
 Igor Mirnov, Russian ice hockey player
 Mirnov oscillations, a type of magnetic field oscillation that is observed in a plasma

Surnames of Russian origin